Rainbow Girls formed in fall of 2010, when a group of friends began performing together at an underground open mic in UC Santa Barbara’s neighboring college town, Isla Vista. Though other musicians would frequently perform alongside them, the original core members of Rainbow Girls consisted of Erin Chapin, Caitlin Gowdey, Vanessa Wilbourn, and Cheyenne Methmann.

The Rainbow Girls spent the following summer (2011) busking and couch-surfing their way around Europe, putting out self-recorded demos as they went.  When they returned to California in the fall, they began playing with drummer Savannah Hughes.  The band gained notoriety in the Santa Barbara area by busking at Farmers Markets, playing beloved venues like SoHo and Cold Spring Tavern, and performing at local festivals like Earth Day and Summer Solstice.

In April 2013, the band left Santa Barbara and moved to the countryside north of San Francisco’s Bay Area.  That same year, Rainbow Girls released their debut album, The Sound of Light, which had been crowdfunded by their fans and community.  Rainbow Girls continued to tour the West Coast incessantly during the year, as well as Europe and the UK every summer.

At the end of 2014, Cheyenne Methmann parted ways with the band.  The remaining four members -Chapin, Gowdey, Wilbourn, and Hughes- recorded their sophomore album, Perceptronium, that winter and released it the following summer (June 2015).

In the spring of 2016, Hughes announced she could no longer tour with the band full time, so the remaining three members of the band -Chapin, Gowdey, and Wilbourn- began performing as a trio.  Though originally intended to be a temporary side-hustle, this stripped-down, acoustic trio version of Rainbow Girls suddenly took off.  Adopting the practice of performing around a single mic, while centering their shows around their harmonies and song-writing, they soon became a highly sought-after act, being added to prominent festivals up and down the west coast and landing opening spots for well-known artists like John Craigie and The Brothers Comatose.

On November 8, 2017, Rainbow Girls released their third and most anticipated album, American Dream, highlighting their new, more acoustic sound.

In the fall of 2018, one of their Facebook cover videos meant to promote a local show went viral and garnered nearly 7 million views.  They immediately went into the studio to record a cover album, Give the People What They Want, which was released February 22, 2019.  Their viral video for the song “Down Home Girl” (originally performed by Alvin Robinson; other notable versions by The Rolling Stones, The Coasters, and Old Crow Medicine Show) also led them to be discovered by Madison House booking agency, as well as by manager Hannah Spero.

References 

Musical groups from the San Francisco Bay Area
Musical groups established in 2010
2010 establishments in California